Vivek Singh is an Indian shooter. He won the silver medal in the Men's Air Pistol, and gold in Men's 50m Pistol (Pairs), with Samaresh Jung, at the 2002 Commonwealth Games. He also won the silver  medal in the Men's 10m Air Pistol at the 2006 Commonwealth Games. He received the Arjuna award by the Government of India in 1999.

References

Indian male sport shooters
ISSF pistol shooters
Living people
Commonwealth Games gold medallists for India
Commonwealth Games silver medallists for India
Shooters at the 2002 Commonwealth Games
Shooters at the 2006 Commonwealth Games
Recipients of the Arjuna Award
Shooters at the 1994 Asian Games
Shooters at the 1998 Asian Games
Commonwealth Games medallists in shooting
Year of birth missing (living people)
Asian Games competitors for India
20th-century Indian people
21st-century Indian people
Medallists at the 2002 Commonwealth Games
Medallists at the 2006 Commonwealth Games